Petrophile prostrata is a species of flowering plant in the family Proteaceae and is endemic to southwestern Western Australia. It is a prostrate shrub with needle-shaped but usually not sharply-pointed leaves and spherical heads of hairy, pale yellow or cream-coloured flowers.

Description
The flowers are mostly arranged on the ends of branchlets in spherical heads  in diameter, with egg-shaped involucral bracts scattered along the stems under the head.

Taxonomy
Petrophile prostrata was first formally described in 2005 by Barbara Lynette Rye and Michael Clyde Hislop in the journal Nuytsia from material collected in the Fitzgerald River National Park in 1999. The specific epithet (prostrata) means "lying on the ground".

Distribution and habitat
This petrophile grows in heathland and shrubland from near Jerramungup to near Hopetoun, including in many locations in the Fitzgerald River National Park.

Conservation status
Petrophile prostrata is classified as "not threatened" by the Western Australian Government Department of Parks and Wildlife.

References

prostrata
Eudicots of Western Australia
Endemic flora of Western Australia
Plants described in 2005
Taxa named by Barbara Lynette Rye